This is a select bibliography of English language books (including translations) and journal articles about the history of the Caucasus. A brief selection of English translations of primary sources is included. Book entries have references to journal articles and reviews about them when helpful.   Additional bibliographies can be found in many of the book-length works listed below; see Further Reading for several book and chapter-length bibliographies. The External Links section contains entries for publicly available select bibliographies from universities. This bibliography specifically excludes non-history related works and self-published books.

Inclusion criteria
Geographic scope of the works include the present day areas of: Armenia, Azerbaijan, Georgia, and the Ciscaucasia region in southern Russia. Works about the Black Sea and the Caspian Sea are included when they relate to the history of the Caucasus.

Included works should either be published by an academic or notable publisher, or be authored by a notable subject matter expert and have reviews in significant scholarly journals. 

Formatting and citation style
This bibliography uses APA style citations. Entries do not use templates; references to reviews and notes for entries do use citation templates. Where books which are only partially related to the history of the Caucasus are listed, the titles for chapters or sections should be indicated if possible, meaningful, and not excessive.

If a work has been translated into English, the translator should be included and a footnote with appropriate bibliographic information for the original language version should be included.

When listing book titles with alternative English spellings, the form used in the latest published version should be used and the version and relevant bibliographic information noted if it previously was published or reviewed under a different title.

General surveys
 King, C. (2012). The Ghost of Freedom: A History of the Caucasus. New York, NY: Oxford University Press.

Pre-colonial era
 Under Construction

Russian colonial era
 Under Construction

Soviet era
 Marshall, A. (2010). The Caucasus Under Soviet Rule. New York City, NY: Routledge.
 Nahaylo, B., & Swoboda, V. (1990). Soviet Disunion: A History of the Nationalities Problem in the USSR. London, UK: Hamilton.
 Saparov, A (2015). From Conflict to Autonomy in the Caucasus: The Soviet Union and the making of Abkhazia, South Ossetia and Nagorno Karabakh. New York City, NY: Routledge.

Post-Soviet era
 Under Construction

Regions
 Under Construction

Adygea
 Under Construction

Armenia
 Laycock, J. & Piana, F. (2020) Aid to Armenia: Humanitarianism and Intervention from the 1890s to the Present'''. Manchester: Manchester University Press.
 Riegg, S. B. (2020). Russia's Entangled Embrace: The Tsarist Empire and the Armenians, 1801–1914. Ithaca: Cornell University Press, Ithaca.

Azerbaijan
 Swietochowski, T. (2010). Russian Azerbaijan, 1905-1920: The Shaping of a National Identity in a Muslim Community (Cambridge Russian, Soviet and Post-Soviet Studies). Cambridge: Cambridge University Press.

Black Sea
 Under Construction

Caspian Sea
 Under Construction

Chechnya
 Under Construction

Dagestan
 Under Construction

Georgia
 Blauvelt, T. K. & Smith, J. (Eds.) (2016). Georgia After Stalin: Nationalism and Soviet Power. London: Routledge.
 Scott, E. (2017). Familiar Strangers: The Georgian Diaspora and the Evolution of Soviet Empire. New York, NY: Oxford University Press.

Ingushetia
 Under Construction

Kabardino-Balkaria
 Under Construction

Karachay-Cherkessia
 Under Construction

North Ossetia–Alania
 Under Construction

North Caucasian Federal District

Other
 Under Construction

Topical
 Forestier-Peyrat, E. (2017). Soviet Federalism at Work: Lessons from the History of the Transcaucasian Federation, 1922–1936. Jahrbücher Für Geschichte Osteuropas, 65(4), pp. 529–559. 

The arts and culture
 Under Construction

Famine, violence and terror
 Under Construction

Religion and philosophy
 Under Construction

Christianity
 Under Construction

Islam
 Under Construction

Judaism
 Under Construction

Rural studies and agriculture
 Under Construction

Urban studies and industry
 Under Construction

Armenia–Azerbaijan conflict
 Under construction

Biographies
 Under Construction

Joseph Stalin

Other
 Blauvelt, T. K. (2021). Clientelism and Nationality in an Early Soviet Fiefdom: The Trials of Nestor Lakoba. London: Routledge.

Historiography and memory studies
 Kotljarchuk, A., & Sundström, O. (2017). Ethnic and Religious Minorities in Stalin's Soviet Union: New Dimensions of Research. Huddinge: Södertörn University.

Memory studies
 Under Construction

Identity studies
 Under Construction

Other works
 Lee, E. (2020). Night of the Bayonets: The Texel Uprising and Hitler's Revenge, April–May 1945. Barnsley: Greenhill Books.

Reference works
 Under Construction

English language translations of primary sources
 Under Construction

Academic journals
 Journal of Baltic Studies (1970present); four issues per year published by Taylor & Francis for the Association for the Advancement of Baltic Studies;  (print),  (online).
 Journal of Borderlands Studies'' (1986present); five issues per year published by Taylor & Francis for the Association for Borderlands Studies;  (print),  (online).

Further reading
The below works have extensive bibliographies.
 Under Construction

See also
 Bibliography of Russian history
 Bibliography of the Soviet Union
 Bibliography of Ukrainian history
 Bibliography of the history of Central Asia

References

Notes

Citations

External links
 Georgia: A selected bibliography of Post-Soviet English publications, Indiana University Bloomington.

 
Caucasus